Ahmet Kurtcebe Alptemoçin (born 27 January 1940 in Bursa) is a Turkish mechanical engineer, industrialist and politician belonging to the Motherland Party. He served as minister of finance and customs between 1984–1985 and minister of foreign affairs between 1990 and 1991.

He graduated from the Middle East Technical University in Ankara with a B.S. degree in mechanical engineering. He was elected in the parliament as the Deputy of Bursa from the Motherland Party.

References

External links

Ministers of Foreign Affairs of Turkey
Ministers of Finance of Turkey
Turkish mechanical engineers
Middle East Technical University alumni
1940 births
Living people
Motherland Party (Turkey) politicians
People from Bursa
Deputies of Bursa
Ministers of Customs and Trade of Turkey
Members of the 45th government of Turkey
Members of the 46th government of Turkey
Members of the 47th government of Turkey
Ministers of State of Turkey